Marie Anne Antoinette Hélène Peretti (13 December 1927 – 25 April 2022) was a French-Brazilian artist.

Biography 
Peretti was born in Paris. Her mother was the French model Antoinette Louise Clotilde Ruffier and her father was João de Medeiros Peretti, a Brazilian historian. In France, Peretti studied at the École nationale supérieure des arts décoratifs and Académie de la Grande Chaumière. Still in France, she illustrated various books and magazines and made her first exposition.

Peretti has lived in Brazil since 1953, when she moved to São Paulo. There, she won the award of best book cover at the São Paulo Art Biennial. Since then, she made various independent expositions and worked with various architects.

Main works 
There are several Peretti works in various cities. In Brasília, she designed the stained glasses of the Cathedral of Brasília, Panteão da Pátria,  Palace of the Jaburu, Chamber of Deputies of Brazil and Federal Senate of Brazil, Superior Court of Justice and Memorial JK.

In Recife the stained glass for the chapel of the Federal Court of the 5th Region (TRF/5ª), of the Court of Justice of Pernambuco (TJPE) and the bronze sculpture at the hall of the Professor Barreto Guimarães School of Public Accounts of the Court of Auditors of Pernambuco are her works.

She made a transparent sculpture for the library of the Memorial of the Latin America, and a big bronze sculpture for the old Latin American Parliament building, in São Paulo.

In Rio de Janeiro, Peretti made the mural of the Museum of Samba at Sambadrome Marquês de Sapucaí. The stained glass at the Cabanagem Memorial, in Belém, is also her work.

Partnership with Oscar Niemeyer 

In Brazil, Peretti met architect Oscar Niemeyer. Since then, her works were part of several Niemeyer buildings, such as the stained glass at the Cathedral of Brasília.

Death 
Peretti died on 25 April 2022, at the Real Hospital Português in Recife. The cause of death was not given. Five days later, she was buried at Cemitério Campo da Esperança, in Asa Sul, Brasília.

References

External links 

1927 births
2022 deaths
20th-century Brazilian women artists
21st-century Brazilian women artists
21st-century Brazilian artists
20th-century French women artists
21st-century French women artists
Artists from Paris
French people of Brazilian descent
French people of Italian descent
Brazilian people of Italian descent
French emigrants to Brazil
Alumni of the Académie de la Grande Chaumière
People from Pernambuco
Women muralists